Cryptopontius is a genus of copepods in the family Artotrogidae.

Species 
 Cryptopontius acutus Kim I.H., 2007
 Cryptopontius aesthetascus Neves & Johnsson, 2008
 Cryptopontius ascidius Kim I.H., 1996
 Cryptopontius brevicaudatus (Brady, 1899)
 Cryptopontius brevifurcatus (Giesbrecht, 1895)
 Cryptopontius capitalis (Giesbrecht, 1895)
 Cryptopontius digitatus Kim I.H., 1996
 Cryptopontius donghaensis Kim I.H., 1996
 Cryptopontius expletus Neves & Johnsson, 2008
 Cryptopontius gracilis C. B. Wilson, 1932
 Cryptopontius graciloides Ummerkutty, 1962
 Cryptopontius ignotus (Brady, 1910)
 Cryptopontius latus (Brady, 1910)
 Cryptopontius longipes Nicholls, 1944
 Cryptopontius madeirensis Johnsson, 2001
 Cryptopontius minor Stock, 1965
 Cryptopontius orientalis Ummerkutty, 1962
 Cryptopontius paracapitalis Nicholls in Eiselt, 1962
 Cryptopontius pentadikos Farias, Neves & Johnsson, 2020
 Cryptopontius phyllogorgius Farias, Neves & Johnsson, 2020
 Cryptopontius proximus Nicholls, 1944
 Cryptopontius quinquesetus Kim I.H., 1996
 Cryptopontius ricinius Malt, 1991
 Cryptopontius similis Nicholls, 1944
 Cryptopontius tanacredii Johnsson, Rocha & Boyko, 2002
 Cryptopontius tenuis (Giesbrecht, 1895)
 Cryptopontius thorelli (Giesbrecht, 1895)
 Cryptopontius innominatus Brady, 1910 accepted as Myzopontius innominatus (Brady, 1910)
 Cryptopontius latus Nicholls, 1944 accepted as Cryptopontius paracapitalis Nicholls in Eiselt, 1962

References

External links 

Siphonostomatoida
Copepod genera